Vicente Calderón de la Barca (1762–1794) was a Spanish painter, who was born at Guadalajara. He was a pupil of Francisco Goya, and distinguished himself as a painter of history and portraits, particularly the latter, in which he executeded. He painted a Birth of St. Norbert for one of the colleges at Ávila.

References

18th-century Spanish painters
18th-century Spanish male artists
Spanish male painters
1762 births
1794 deaths